Angelo Maturino Blanchet or Ange-Mathurin Blanchet (3 March 1892 – 9 November 1974) was the Italian Bishop of the Roman Catholic Diocese of Aosta from his appointment by Pope Pius XII on 18 February 1946 until his retirement on 15 October 1968.

Biography 

Born in Gressan from Pierre-Aimable and Caroline in 1892, Blanchet had the solemn profession for the Oblates of Mary Immaculate in 1920 and was ordained a Catholic priest on 29 June 1921. He was appointed superior of his Order in Pescara.

He was appointed bishop of Aosta on 18 February 1946. He was council father during the four sessions of the Second Vatican Council.

During his ministry he founded or re-founded seven new parishes, five in Aosta (Saint-Martin-de-Corléans, St. Mary Immaculate, St. Anselm, Signayes and Porossan), Champoluc and Entrèves. He opened three Diocesan Eucharistic congresses and six pastoral visits, ordering seventy-eight priests.

He resigned due to an age limit on 15 October 1968 and was appointed titular bishop of Limata. He died on 9 November 1974 at the Saint-Jacquême priory in Saint-Pierre.

References

External links
Profile of Mons. Blanchet www.catholic-hierarchy.org 
Official Page of diocese of Aosta

1892 births
Bishops of Aosta
20th-century Italian Roman Catholic bishops
1974 deaths
People from Aosta Valley
Missionary Oblates of Mary Immaculate